, who was born in 1978, is a Japanese author from Yokohama city, Kanagawa prefecture located in the southern Kantō region of Honshū, Japan. He made his debut with the novel  in 2000, winning Gold in the 7th Dengeki Novel Prize.

Works

Onmyo no Miyako series 
 Volume 1
 Volume 2
 Volume 3
 Volume 4
 Volume 5

Parasite Moon series 
 Volume 1 -Kazamitori no Su-
 Volume 2 -Nezumi tachi no Kyoen-
 Volume 3 -Hyakunen Garō-
 Volume 4 -Koin Yowa-
 Volume 5 -Suityu Teien no Sakana-
 Volume 6 -Meikyu no Maigo tachi-

Sora no Kane no Hibiku Hoshi de series 
 Volume 1
 Volume 2
 Volume 3
 Volume 4
 Volume 5
 Volume 6
 Volume 7
 Volume 8
 Volume 9
 Volume 10
 Volume 11
 Volume 12
 Gaiden -tea party's story-

Rinkan no Madoshi series 
 Volume 1
 Volume 2
 Volume 3
 Volume 4
 Volume 5
 Volume 6
 Volume 7
 Volume 8
 Volume 9
 Volume 10

Sword Art Online Alternative: Clover's Regret 
 Volume 1
 Volume 2
 Volume 3

Others

External links
 Soichoro Watase's website

1978 births
Living people
21st-century Japanese novelists
Light novelists
Japanese fantasy writers